Henryville is a municipality in Le Haut-Richelieu Regional County Municipality in the Montérégie region of Quebec, Canada. The population as of the Canada 2011 Census was 1,464. Henryville is the birthplace of Bat Masterson, a figure from the late 19th century U.S. wild west who became a New York City newspaper columnist during the early 20th century.

Demographics
Population

Language

See also
List of municipalities in Quebec
Municipal history of Quebec

References

Municipalities in Quebec
Incorporated places in Le Haut-Richelieu Regional County Municipality
Designated places in Quebec